Siaogang District is a district of Kaohsiung City in southern Taiwan. Before the merging of Kaohsiung City and Kaohsiung County in 2010, Siaogang was the southernmost district in Kaohsiung City. The second largest airport in Taiwan, Kaohsiung International Airport, is located in Siaogang.

History
Siaogang was developed during Dutch era. The Dutch built Ang Moh Harbor as an addition to Anping Harbor in Tainan. After the Dutch were defeated by Koxinga, they left Taiwan. Koxinga's government developed Taiwan as the last stronghold to revive the Ming Dynasty and prepare his troops to fight against the Qing dynasty. He sent one of his men, Wu Yanshang, to expand Siaogang. After the demise of Koxinga, his son and his grandson, the Qing managed to defeat the Kingdom of Tungning and annexed Taiwan.

Empire of Japan
In 1895, the Qing dynasty ceded Taiwan to Japan in the Treaty of Shimonoseki after losing the First Sino-Japanese War, and Siaogang was used to produce sugar for Japanese. In 1920, the original name of Kang-a-ki was changed, and the incorporated areas were administered as  under Hōzan District, Takao Prefecture. As a heavy industry base in Taiwan during World War II, Siaogang was more heavily bombed by the Allied force than other parts of the city.

Republic of China
After the war and the handover of Taiwan from Japan to the Republic of China, Siaogang was administrated as Siaogang Township of Kaohsiung County, a third-level government of the Republic of China, under Taiwan Province. Siaogang was annexed by Kaohsiung City and become Siaogang District on 1 July 1979, when Kaohsiung City became a special municipality.

Geography

Siaogang is located in the southern part of Kaohsiung. It borders Cianjhen District to the north,  Daliao District to the east, Linyuan District to the south, and the Taiwan Strait to the west.

Administrative divisions
The district consists of Xiaogang, Gangkou, Gangzheng, Gangqi, Gangming, Ganghou, Gangnan, Gangxing, Fenggong, Dianzhen, Daling, Erling, Sanling, Zhengling, Shunling, Liuling, Hongliang, Shantung, Jingdao, Jinan, Taishan, Shanming, Gaosong, Songjin, Songshan, Daping, Pingding, Kongzhai, Xiazhuang, Gezuo, Guilin, Zhongcuo, Fengming, Longfeng, Fengsen, Fenglin, Fengxing and Fengyuan Village.

Economy

As far as the industry of Taiwan is concerned, Siaogang is one of the most important
regions for the shipbuilding and steel industries.  During the 1970s, the government spent 5 years carrying out Ten Major Construction Projects. Two companies resulting from the projects are based here: China Steel and CSBC Corporation, Taiwan.  CPC Corporation, Taiwan also a part of the ten projects, has a major oil refinery facility located here.  With the proximity of Kaohsiung Harbor, the products of these  companies are exported worldwide. These products are also transported throughout the island via National Highway No. 1 (Taiwan), which terminates on the northern border of the district.

Education

Elementary schools
 Kaohsiung Municipal Siaogang Elementary School
 Kaohsiung Municipal Taiping Elementary School
 Kaohsiung Municipal Cingshan Elementary School
 Kaohsiung Municipal Pingding Elementary School
 Kaohsiung Municipal Fonglin Elementary School
 Kaohsiung Municipal Huashan Elementary School
 Kaohsiung Municipal Fongyang Elementary School
 Kaohsiung Municipal Huashan Elementary School
 Kaohsiung Municipal Ganghe Elementary School
 Kaohsiung Municipal Mingyi Elementary School
 Kaohsiung Municipal Erling Elementary School
 Kaohsiung Municipal Guilin Elementary School
 Kaohsiung Municipal Hanmin Elementary School
 Kaohsiung Municipal Fongming Elementary School

Junior high schools
 Kaohsiung Municipal Siaogang Junior High School 
 Kaohsiung Municipal Jhongshan Junior High School 
 Kaohsiung Municipal Mingyi Junior High School
 Kaohsiung Municipal Fonglin Junior High School
 Kahosiung Municipal Hospitality Junior High School

Senior High Schools
 The Affiliated Hospitality Senior High School of National Kaohsiung University of Hospitality and

Universities
 National Kaohsiung University of Hospitality and Tourism
 Open University of Kaohsiung

Tourist attractions
 Dapingding Tropical Botanical Garden
 Hongmaogang Cultural Park
 Kaohsiung Astronomical Museum
 Kaohsiung Municipal Social Education Hall
 Kaohsiung ParkThe name comes from its shape: it is built in the shape of Chinese character "高" (pronounced "Gao", meaning high, tall). It was once a lighthouse. After the building of second harbor of Kaohsiung, it was renewed and became a tourist attraction. The shape of the building is not only a Chinese character but also represent the spirit of Kaohsiung.

Infrastructure
 Talin Power Plant

Transportation

Air
The Kaohsiung International Airport is located within the district

Railway
The district is accessible by Kaohsiung International Airport Station and Siaogang Station of the Kaohsiung Mass Rapid Transit.

Road (Siaogang station)

Notable natives
 Sung Chi-li, cult leader and geomancer
 Huang Ching-ya, politician

References

External links

 

Districts of Kaohsiung